Worms 3D is a 3D artillery turn-based tactical game in the Worms series. It was developed by Team17. The game was the first in the series to be in 3D and also featured several new weapons.  Additionally, some of the weapons operations are substantially different from previous Worms titles.

The game was announced by Team17 in 2002 as Worms 3, featuring a different logo and initially was to be published by Activision. In 2003 the name changed to Worms 3D and Activision was dropped as the publisher. Sega took the license to publish the game in European territories.

Gameplay

The gameplay itself is mostly unchanged from its predecessors, with the exception of the three-dimensional view, which allows the player more freedom, and more possibilities, to complete the task at hand. Modes such as Campaign and Quick Match return from previous versions. The game also features a multiplayer feature, as well as the ability to edit and create teams. The objective of most of the matches is to eliminate the opposing forces' worms, whereas the Campaign mode gives the player sets of specific goals which he needs to complete. The Campaign consists of 35 small missions in which the player has to utilise their worms to complete a certain task, like destroy enemy worms, collect a certain crate, or even unique missions, such as having to detonate 16 hidden landmines in a certain time. All of the missions give awards depending on how well the player does. Gold medals usually unlock bonuses as for example maps, challenge missions, information about weapons, or voice banks.

As in Worms 3Ds predecessors, the worms continue to fight using a wide range of conventional or droll weapons, including rockets, explosives, firearms, and air strikes, whilst also traversing the island using utilities when those items are available. The entire inventory is derivative of the game's immediate predecessors, but is noticeably simplified and lacks certain previously existed items, including digging tools such as the blowtorch.

In the Challenge missions, the player has to use a weapon/utility to collect targets that add to their timebank, which increases steadily. Getting a gold medal here unlocks maps or locked weapons.

Development
The game was announced by Team17 in 2002 as Worms 3, featuring a different logo and initially announced to be published by Activision. In 2003, the name changed to Worms 3D and Activision were dropped as the publisher. It was later announced that Sega would be publishing the game in European territories.

The game was announced at E3 2003, featuring two different maps for demonstration. The game was published in Europe for GameCube, Microsoft Windows, PlayStation 2, and Xbox by Sega on 31 October 2003. In North America, it was published for all the said platforms by Acclaim Entertainment on 11 March 2004, except Xbox, for which Sega released a North American version on 1 March 2005. It was ported to Macintosh and published by Feral Interactive on 14 May 2004.

Reception

The Xbox, PC, and PlayStation 2 versions of Worms 3D received mixed reviews, but the GameCube version received fairly positive reviews. Its graphics and sounds were lauded. Despite this, most reviewers criticized the 3D camera system, that often places behind the objects in landscape with the worm being hidden in front of those and stiff controlling of the worm. Andy Davidson, the creator of the Worms franchise and who had already left Team17 before returning in 2012, objected to the company's decision to develop a 3D Worms game. He argued that Worms and its mechanics were based on two dimensions only and that adding another dimension broke much of the mechanics. He said that rather than trying to "recreate" Worms itself, he would have preferred to start from scratch and build a 3D game containing the same qualities as the series.

Worms 3D won the Entertainment and Leisure Software Publishers Association silver award, indicating that the game sold at least 100,000 copies in the United Kingdom.

References

External links
 Official site
 

2003 video games
Acclaim Entertainment games
Artillery video games
Feral Interactive games
GameCube games
MacOS games
PlayStation 2 games
Sega video games
Strategy video games
Video games scored by Bjørn Lynne
Video games using Havok
Windows games
 05
Xbox games
Video games developed in the United Kingdom